"Love Is No Excuse" is a song recorded by American country music artists Jim Reeves and Dottie West. It was released in February 1964 and peaked at number 7 on the Billboard Hot Country Singles chart and #15 on the Bubbling Under Hot 100 singles listing. The song was also recorded by Ernest Tubb, John Grier, Connie Smith in French and English, Hank King, Jack Greene and Jeannie Seely, Shot Jackson, and Tiny Tim.

Chart performance

References

1964 singles
Dottie West songs
Jim Reeves songs
Male–female vocal duets
Song recordings produced by Chet Atkins
Songs written by Justin Tubb
RCA Records singles
1964 songs